The list of ship launches in 1678 includes a chronological list of some ships launched in 1678.


References

1678
Ship launches